Clinidium grimaldii is a species of ground beetle in the subfamily Rhysodinae. It was described by Ross Bell & J.R. Bell in 2009 and named after entomologist David Grimaldi. The description was based on a male specimen (the holotype) originating from Oligo–Miocene amber from the Dominican Republic.

References

Clinidium
Beetles described in 2009
Fossil taxa described in 2009